The UEFA European Under-18 Championship 1984 Final Tournament was held in the Soviet Union. It also served as the European qualification for the 1985 FIFA World Youth Championship.

Qualification

Group 8

Other Groups

|}

1The match Netherlands - Luxembourg at IJmuiden ended 1–0 but was awarded 0–3 to Luxembourg due to fireworks thrown on the field, injuring the Luxembourg keeper.

Teams
The following teams qualified for the tournament:

 
 
 
 
 
 
 
 
 
 
 
 
 
  (host)

Squads

Group stage

Group A

Group B

Group C

Group D

Semifinals

Third place match

Final

Qualification to World Youth Championship
The six best performing teams qualified for the 1985 FIFA World Youth Championship: four semifinalists and the best group runners-up (based on points, goal difference and scored goals). This would mean that both Poland and Scotland should have qualified. As for Poland, officials of the Polish Football Association (PZPN) missed deadline for application to the tournament. It is not clear why Scotland did not participate.

 
 
 
 
  (host)

References

External links
Results by RSSSF
1984 UEFA European Under-18 Championship in the Soviet Union. Kopanyi Myach

UEFA European Under-19 Championship
1983
Under-18
UEFA
UEFA European Under-18 Championship
UEFA European Under-18 Championship
UEFA European Under-18 Championship
UEFA European Under-18 Championship, 1984
Sports competitions in Moscow
UEFA European Under-18 Championship
UEFA European Under-18 Championship